Mugilogobius tigrinus is a small species of goby from mangrove creeks and pools in southeast Asia.

References 

tigrinus
Fish of Thailand
Freshwater fish of Southeast Asia
Fish described in 2001
Taxa named by Helen K. Larson